SS Roosevelt may refer to:

 , an American steamship that supported Robert Peary′s polar expeditions
 , the name of more than one ship

See also
, which may refer to various United States Navy ships

Ship names